Santo Domingo Roayaga is a town and municipality in Oaxaca in south-western Mexico. The municipality covers an area of  km². 
It is part of the Villa Alta District in the center of the Sierra Norte Region.

References

Municipalities of Oaxaca